The National Center for Geographic Information and Analysis (NCGIA) was founded in 1988 and hosted at three member campuses: The University of California, Santa Barbara; the State University of New York at Buffalo; and the University of Maine.

The center was founded after receiving  a $5 million grant from the National Science Foundation. Ron Abler—then at NSF—described the rationale for the NCGIA and compared it to corresponding efforts in the UK.

Notable faculty involved with the NCGIA include Michael Goodchild, Michael Batty, David Mark, A. Stewart Fotheringham, Andrew Frank, Helen Couclelis, Keith Clarke, Luc Anselin, Waldo R. Tobler amongst others. David William Rhind and Mike Goodchild compare later US and the UK approach.

The research plan was organized along so-called Research Initiatives, which generally started and ended with "specialist meetings", where interdisciplinary teams discussed pressing research issues. Often a publication followed:

 Initiative 1: Accuracy of spatial databases, led by Michael Goodchild
 Initiative 2: Languages of Spatial Relations, led by   David Mark   and Andrew U. Frank 
 Initiative 3: Multiple Representations, led by Barbara Buttenfield
 Initiative 4: The Use and Value of Geographic Information, led by  Harlan Onsrud   and Hugh Calkins 
 Initiative 5: Architecture of Very Large Spatial Databases, led by  Terence Smith   and Andrew U. Frank
 Initiative 6: Spatial Decision Support Systems (SDSS), led by Paul Densham  and Michael Goodchild 
 Initiative 7: Visualizing the Quality of Spatial Information, led by Kate Beard   and Barbara Buttenfield  
 Initiative 8: Formalizing Cartographic Knowledge, led by Barbara Buttenfield 
 Initiative 9: Institutions Sharing Geographic Information, led by  Harlan Onsrud   and Gerard Rushton
 Initiative 10: Spatio-Temporal Reasoning in GIS, led by  Max Egenhofer   and Reginald Golledge

 Initiative 12: Integration of Remote Sensing and GIS, led by John Estes, Frank Davis and Jeffrey Star

In 1992 the list of publications resulting from these research initiatives and other efforts of the NCGIA were published in the International Journal of Geographical Information Systems.

The NCGIA produces a Core Curriculum for teaching Geographic Information Systems

See also
UCSB Center for Spatial Studies
Geographic information science
Geographic Information Systems
University Consortium for Geographic Information Science

References

External links
NCGIA Official website
NCGIA @ U. of Maine
NCGIA @ Buffalo
UCSB Center for Spatial Studies (spatial@ucsb)

1988 establishments in the United States
Research institutes established in 1988
Geographic data and information organizations in the United States